The Men's 15 km freestyle interval start was part of the FIS Nordic World Ski Championships 2005's events held in Oberstdorf, Germany. The race went underway on 17 February 2005 at 15:00 CET. The defending world champion was Germany's Axel Teichmann, then in classical style.

Results

References

FIS Nordic World Ski Championships 2005